Conophis lineatus, the  road guarder, is a species of snake in the family Colubridae. The species is native to Mexico, El Salvador, Honduras, Belize, Nicaragua, Costa Rica, and Guatemala.

References

Conophis
Snakes of North America
Reptiles described in 1854
Reptiles of Guatemala
Reptiles of El Salvador
Reptiles of Mexico
Taxa named by André Marie Constant Duméril
Taxa named by Gabriel Bibron
Taxa named by Auguste Duméril